Calima is a municipality located in the Department of Valle del Cauca, Colombia. Its main urban area is the town of Darién.

References

Municipalities of Valle del Cauca Department